The Delturinae are a subfamily of catfishes (order Siluriformes) of the family Loricariidae, including two genera, Delturus and Hemipsilichthys. This group is sister to all other loricariids except Lithogenes. The geographical distribution of Delturinae, exclusively on the southeastern Brazilian Shield, indicates southeastern Brazil acts as either a refugium for basal loricariid taxa or a point of origin for the Loricariidae.

Both genera can be separated from all other loricariids by the presence of a postdorsal ridge made up of raised, median, unpaired plates and the presence of an adipose fin membrane. Hemipsilichthys can be separated from Delturus by not having the anterior plates of the ridge contacting the lateral plates (juveniles of Delturus also have this condition) and by having a rectangular (vs. V-shaped) spinelet.

References

Loricariidae
Taxa named by Roberto Esser dos Reis
Fish subfamilies